Recipe(s) for Disaster may refer to:

 Recipe for Disaster (album), 2005 album by Brand New Sin
 Recipe for Disaster (book), 1994 novel by Lillian Tindyebwa
 Recipes for Disaster, 2004 book by CrimethInc.
 "Recipe for Disaster", an episode from season one of The Grim Adventures of Billy & Mandy
 "Recipe for Disaster," episode 16 from Season 1 of Masha and the Bear, the fourth most-viewed video on Youtube.